Aminoisobutyric acid may refer to either of two isomeric chemical compounds:

 2-Aminoisobutyric acid (AIB)
 3-Aminoisobutyric acid